Albizia glabripetala is a species of plant in the family Fabaceae. It is found in Brazil, Guyana, and Venezuela.

References

glabripetala
Flora of the Amazon
Trees of South America
Near threatened plants
Near threatened biota of South America
Taxonomy articles created by Polbot